Clair Linzey is a British theologian, ethicist and writer. She is the Frances Power Cobbe Professor of Animal Theology at the Graduate Theological Foundation, Deputy Director of the Oxford Centre for Animal Ethics and the director of their annual summer school. Linzey is also co-editor of the Palgrave Macmillan Animal Ethics Series and the Journal of Animal Ethics. She specialises in animal theology, animal ethics, environmental ethics, systematic theology, feminist theology and Christian moral thought.

Early life and education 
Linzey is the daughter of the theologian Andrew Linzey. In 2004, she received a Master of Arts in Theological Studies from the University of St Andrews, Scotland, where she received several prizes. Linzey received two scholarships to study for a Master of Theological Studies at Harvard Divinity School, graduating in 2008. She received her doctorate on the ecological theology of Leonardo Boff, with a particular focus on its relation to animals, also from St Andrews.

Bibliography 
Volumes co-edited with Andrew Linzey:

 Animal Ethics for Veterinarians (University of Illinois Press, 2017)
 The Ethical Case Against Animal Experiments (University of Illinois Press,  2018)
 The Palgrave Macmillan Handbook of Practical Animal Ethics (Palgrave Macmillan, 2018)
 The Routledge Handbook of Religion and Animal Ethics (Routledge, 2018)
 Ethical Vegetarianism and Veganism (Routledge, 2018)

References

External links 
 Clair Linzey PhD - Animal Theology Keynote

Date of birth missing (living people)
Living people
21st-century British theologians
Alumni of the University of St Andrews
Animal ethicists
British animal rights scholars
British book editors
British vegetarianism activists
Environmental ethicists
Graduate Theological Foundation faculty
Harvard Divinity School alumni
Philosophy journal editors
Women theologians
Year of birth missing (living people)